Angram Reservoir is the first of three reservoirs on the River Nidd in Upper Nidderdale, North Yorkshire, England, the others being Scar House Reservoir and finally the compensation reservoir Gouthwaite Reservoir. It is located at OS map reference . Between them they attract around 150,000 visitors a year.

The reservoir takes its name from Angram, a settlement in the township of Stonebeck Up, submerged when the reservoir was completed in 1919.

Little Whernside to the north and Great Whernside to the west of the reservoir are close by.

History 
The reservoir was built to supply water to the Bradford area of West Yorkshire.  It was built by Bradford Corporation between 1904 and 1919, under an Act of Parliament in 1890 which also authorised the corporation to construct three other reservoirs in upper Nidderdale.  Haden Carr reservoir was first built in the 1890s, just below Angram, and the works included the Nidd Aqueduct, by which water was transferred from Haden Carr to Chellow Heights via the Nidd Aqueduct using gravity only and no pumping.   A small village was constructed at Angram site to house workers.  The dam was faced with stone, which came from a quarry on the south side of the dale above Scar House, two miles down the dale.

Two bypass channels on each side of the reservoir were used to bypass the reservoir and maintain the level of the River Nidd. Once Scar House Reservoir was constructed, these become obsolete, but control machinery can still be seen on the Nidd and Stone beck inlets.

Facilities 
There is a shelter near the dam, but no other facilities.  Near the dam of Scar House Reservoir,  from the dam of Angram Reservoir, there is a car park, picnic areas and toilets.

There is a permissive footpath across the dam and around the reservoir. Fishing is not permitted at the reservoir.

References

External links 

 Nidderdale AONB website
 Yorkshire Water Recreation Page

Nidderdale
Angram
Reservoirs in North Yorkshire
RAngram